Rochelle Bass Owens (born April 2, 1936 in Brooklyn, New York) is an American poet and playwright.

Life and career 
Owens is the daughter of Maxwell and Molly (Adler) Bass. She was born and raised in Brooklyn, New York, then studied at the New School for Social Research and the University of Montreal.

After a brief marriage to David Owens, she married the poet George Economou on June 17, 1962. Owens has taught at Brown University, the University of California-San Diego, the University of Oklahoma, and the University of Southwestern Louisiana. As of 2018, Owens lives in Wellfleet, Massachusetts and Philadelphia. Her biography is published in Gale Research Contemporary Authors, Volume 2 (1983). In 2006, she was celebrated in La MaMa's Coffeehouse Chronicles series.

Theatre
She was highly involved in the early off-off-Broadway theatre movement. As a poet, she contributed greatly to the St. Marks Poetry Project and was a founding participant in Mickey Ruskin and Bill Mackey's Cafe Deux Megots on 7th Street in the East Village. Owens was also involved in the ethnopoetics movement. Her work has influenced experimental playwrights and poets in subsequent generations.

During the 1960s and 1970s, Owens' plays premiered in New York City at the Judson Poets Theatre, La MaMa Experimental Theatre Club, Theater for the New City, and the American Place Theatre. She was a founding member of the New York Theater Strategy and the Women's Theater Council. Her play Futz was first published in 1961 and is foundational to the off-off-Broadway canon. It raised some controversy, and was banned in Toronto and called a "lust and bestiality play" by a newspaper in Edinburgh. Futz was made into a film in 1969. The cast includes Sally Kirkland and Frederic Forrest.

Owens' plays have been performed in theatre festivals in Edinburgh, Avignon, Paris, and Berlin.

Poetry
Owens at the age of 19 had her poetry published in LeRoi Jones' (as Amiri Baraka was known then) and Hettie Jones’ magazine Yugen. Owens’ poems appear in the volume Jones edited in 1962 titled "Four Young Lady Poets".  Owens may not refer to herself as a "Beat poet", but she was there and influential among the Beat poets and that movement in New York. She read her poems at The Poetry Project at St. Marks Church In-the-Bowery in New York City, on the same bill that included Allen Ginsberg and Gregory Corso. Allen Ginsberg introduced her poetry to LeRoi Jones.

Radio
In 1984, after relocating to Norman, Oklahoma, Owens hosted "The Writers Mind", a radio interview program from the University of Oklahoma with various artists.

Awards and recognition 

 1965 - Rockefeller Foundation grant
 1965, 1967, 1982 - Village Voice Obie Awards
 1971 - Guggenheim Fellowship
 1973 - ASCAP Award
 1976 - National Endowment for the Arts grant
 1984 - honors from the New York Drama Critics' Circle
 1993 - Rockefeller Fellowship at Bellagio Center
 1994 - Oklahoma Book Award finalist
 New York Creative Artists in Public Service Program

Selected works

Plays 

The String Game, Judson Poets Theatre, New York City, 1965; published by Methuen: 1969
Futz, Tyrone Guthrie Workshop Theatre, Minneapolis, 1965; Cafe La Mama, New York City, 1967; published by Hawk's Well Press: 1962, and Methuen: 1969
 Homo, Cafe La Mama, 1966; Ambiance Theater, London, 1966; published by Hawk's Well Press: 1968
  Judson Poets Theatre, 1968; Actors Playhouse, New York City, 1971
 Beclch, Theatre for the Living Arts, Philadelphia; Gate Theatre, New York City, 1968; published by Hawk's Well Press: 1968
  produced in New York City, 1968
 Queen of Greece, La Mama E.T.C., New York City, 1969; published by Alexander Street Press: 2003
 He Wants Shih, La MaMa, New York City, 1973; published by Dutton: 1974
  American Place Theatre, New York City, 1973
 O.K. Certaldo, published by Dutton: 1974
 Kontraption, published by Dutton: 1974; New York Theater Strategy, 1976
 Coconut Folk-Singer, published by Dutton: 1974
 Farmer's Almanac, published by Dutton: 1974
 Emma Instigated Me, New York City, 1976; published in Performance Arts Journal: 1976
 The Widow And The Colonel published in Best Short Plays 1977
 Who Do You Want, Piere Vidal?, Theatre for the New City, New York City, 1982
 Chucky's Hunch, Theatre for the New City, 1981; Harold Clurman Theatre, New York City, 1982
 
 Mountain Rites, published by Alexander Street Press: 2003
 Sweet Potatoes, published by Alexander Street Press: 2003

Screenplays 
 Futz, Commonwealth United: 1969

Poetry 
 
 
 
 
 The Joe Eighty-Two Creation Poems, Black Sparrow Press: 1974
 The Joe Chronicles II, Black Sparrow Press, 1977
 
 
 
 
 W.C. Fields In French Light, Contact 2 Press: 1986
 How Much Paint Does The Painting Need, Kulchur Press 1988
 Black Chalk, Texture Press 1992
 Rubbed Stones and Other Poems, Texture Press: 1994
 New And Selected Poems 1961-1996, Junction Press 1997
 Luca,Discourse On Life And Death, Junction Press: 2000
 Triptych, Texture Press: 2006
 Solitary Workwoman, Junction Press: 2011
 Out of Ur - New & Selected Poems 1961 - 2012, Shearsman Books 2012
 Hermaphropoetics, Drifting Geometries, Singing Horse Press 2017

Anthologies 
 
 
 New American Plays (Vol. 2), Hoffman, Hill, Wang, 1968
 The New Underground Theater, Schroeder, Bantam Books: 1968
 Technicians of the Sacred, Doubleday: 1969
 Inside Outer Space, Anchor Books: 1970
 The Best Short Plays, Chilton: 1971, 1977, 1978
 The Off-Off Broadway Book, Poland, Mailman, Bobbs-Merrill: 1972
 America A Prophecy, Rothenberg, Quasha, Random House: 1973
 No More Masks, Howe, Bass, Anchor/Doubleday: 1973
 Psyche: The Feminine Poetic Consciousness, Segnitz, Rainey, Dial Press: 1973
 Rising Tides: 20th Century American Women Poets, Chester, Barba, Washington Square Press: 1973
 A Big Jewish Book, Rothenberg, Lenowitz, Doubleday: 1979
 Scenarios: Scripts to Perform, Richard Kostelanetz, Assembling Press: 1980
 A Century In Two Decades, Burning Deck Press: 1982
 Exiled In The Word, Copper Canyon Press: 1989
 Deep Down: The New Sensual Writing by Women, Faber and Faber: 1989
 Poems For The Millennium (Vol. 2): 1998
 The Columbia Granger's Index to Poetry, Kale, Granger, Columbia University Press: 2002
 North American Women's Plays from Colonial Times to the Present, Alexander Street Press: 2003
 All Poets Welcome: The Lower East Side Poetry Scene in the 60's, University of California Press: 2003
 Light Years, Spuyten Duyvil, Awareing Press: 2010

Radio plays 
 The Widow And The Colonel, 1976 (commissioned by Voice of America for the bicentennial)
 Sweet Potatoes, 1977

Videos 

 Oklahoma Too, 1987
 How much Paint Does The Painting Need, 1991
 Black Chalk, 1994

Sound recordings 
 A Shaman's Notebook, Broadside Records 1968
 The Karl Marx Play, lyrics by Owens, music by Galt MacDermot, Kilmarnock 1974
 Black Box 17
 San Francisco State University, Poetry Center and American Poetry Archives 1987

Translations (to English) 
  The Passersby, trans. Owens, Henry Holt: 1993 from the French Les Passants by Liliane Atlan

As editor 

 Spontaneous Combustion: Eight New American Plays, Winterhouse: 1972

Novels 

 Journey To Purity, Texture Press: 2009

References

External links
 RochelleOwens.net
 Rochelle Owens Papers at Special Collections, University Library, University of California, Davis
Finding aid to Rochelle Owens papers at Columbia University. Rare Book & Manuscript Library.

1936 births
Living people
Beat Generation writers
The New School alumni
Université de Montréal alumni
Brown University faculty
University of California, San Diego faculty
University of Oklahoma faculty
University of Louisiana at Lafayette faculty
Writers from Brooklyn
American translators
French–English translators
American women poets
Poets from New York (state)
American women dramatists and playwrights
Lafayette High School (New York City) alumni
American women academics
21st-century American women